This is an incomplete list, which may never be able to satisfy certain standards for completion.

There are many conditions of or affecting the human circulatory system — the biological system that includes the pumping and channeling of blood to and from the body and lungs with heart, blood and blood vessels.

Cardiovascular 
 Angina
 Acute coronary syndrome
 Anomic aphasia
 Aortic dissection
 Aortic regurgitation
 Aortic stenosis
 Apoplexy
 Apraxia
 Arrhythmias
 Asymmetric septal hypertrophy (ASH)
 Atherosclerosis
 Atrial flutter
 Atrial septal defect
 Atrioventricular canal defect
 Atrioventricular septal defect
 Avascular necrosis'Cardiac electrophysiologySee also :Category:Cardiac electrophysiology AV nodal reentrant tachycardia (Atrioventricular nodal reentrant tachycardia)
 Accelerated idioventricular rhythm
 Andersen–Tawil syndrome (Andersen cardiodysrhythmic periodic paralysis, Andersen syndrome, Long QT syndrome 7; Periodic paralysis, potassium-sensitive cardiodysrhythmic type)
 Ashman phenomenon (Ashman beats)
 Atrial fibrillation
 Atrial fibrillation with rapid ventricular response
 Atrial flutter
 Atrial tachycardia
 Bifascicular block
 Brugada syndrome (Sudden Unexpected Death Syndrome)
 Bundle branch block
 Cardiac dysrhythmia (Cardiac arrhythmia)
 Catecholaminergic polymorphic ventricular tachycardia
 Ectopic beat (cardiac ectopy)
 Ectopic pacemaker (Ectopic focus)
 First-degree atrioventricular block (First-degree AV block, PR prolongation)
 Heart block
 Inappropriate sinus tachycardia
 Jervell and Lange-Nielsen syndrome
 Junctional escape beat
 Junctional rhythm
 Left bundle branch block
 Left anterior fascicular block
 Left axis deviation
 Lev's disease (Lenegre-Lev syndrome)
 Long QT syndrome
 Lown–Ganong–Levine syndrome
 Multifocal atrial tachycardia
 Wolff–Parkinson–White syndrome

Congenital heart diseaseSee also :Category:Congenital heart defects Aortic coarctation (Aortic coarctation)
 Acyanotic heart defect
 Atrial septal defect
 Cor triatriatum
 Dextro-Transposition of the great arteries
 Double aortic arch
 Double inlet left ventricle
 Double outlet right ventricle
 Ebstein's anomaly
 GUCH

Cyanotic heart defect
 Tetralogy of Fallot (ToF)
 Total anomalous pulmonary venous connection
 Hypoplastic left heart syndrome (HLHS)
 Transposition of the great arteries (d-TGA)
 Truncus arteriosus (Persistent)
 Tricuspid atresia
 Interrupted aortic arch
 Coarctation of aorta
 Pulmonary atresia (PA)
 Pulmonary stenosis (critical)

Non-cyanotic heart defects
 Atrial septal defect
 Ventricular septal defect
 Patent ductus arteriosus and
 Coarctation of aorta (may cause cyanosis in some cases)

Ischemic heart diseasesSee also :Category:Ischemic heart diseases Angina pectoris
 Acute coronary syndrome
 Acute myocardial infarction

Valvular heart diseaseSee also :Category:Valvular heart disease''
 Aortic insufficiency
 Mitral stenosis
 Tricuspid valve stenosis
 Pulmonary valve stenosis
 Mitral insufficiency/regurgitation
 Tricuspid insufficiency/regurgitation
 Pulmonary insufficiency/regurgitation

Vascular disease

See also :Category:Vascular surgery
 Aortic aneurysm

References

Lists of diseases